There are about 420 known moth species of Saudi Arabia. The moths (mostly nocturnal) and butterflies (mostly diurnal) together make up the taxonomic order Lepidoptera.

This is a list of moth species which have been recorded in Saudi Arabia.

Arctiidae
Apisa arabica Warnecke, 1934
Apisa canescens Walker, 1855
Creatonotos leucanioides Holland, 1893
Lepista arabica (Rebel, 1907)
Nyctemera torbeni Wiltshire, 1983
Siccia arabica Wiltshire, 1983
Siccia buettikeri Wiltshire, 1988
Spilosoma feifensis Wiltshire, 1986
Thyretes buettikeri Wiltshire, 1983
Utetheisa amhara Jordan, 1939
Utetheisa lotrix (Cramer, 1779)
Utetheisa pulchella (Linnaeus, 1758)

Autostichidae
Heringita amselina (Gozmány, 1967)
Hesperesta arabica Gozmány, 2000
Turatia arenacella Gozmány, 2000
Turatia striatula Gozmány, 2000

Brachodidae
Nigilgia talhouki Diakonoff, 1983
Phycodes chalcocrossa (Meyrick, 1909)

Carposinidae
Metacosmesis xerostola Diakonoff, 1983

Choreutidae
Choreutis aegyptiaca (Zeller, 1867)
Tebenna micalis (Mann, 1857)

Coleophoridae
Coleophora ammodyta Falkovitsh, 1970
Coleophora aularia Meyrick, 1924
Coleophora cyrniella Rebel, 1926
Coleophora emberizella Baldizzone, 1985
Coleophora hospitiella Chrétien, 1915
Coleophora jebeli Baldizzone, 1985
Coleophora jerusalemella Toll, 1942
Coleophora lasloella Baldizzone, 1982
Coleophora nurmahal Toll, 1957
Coleophora praecipua Walsingham, 1907
Coleophora sarehma Toll, 1956
Coleophora saudita Baldizzone, 1985
Coleophora shadeganensis Toll, 1959
Coleophora sudanella Rebel, 1916
Coleophora viettella Toll, 1956

Cosmopterigidae
Alloclita cerritella (Riedl, 1993)
Alloclita delozona Meyrick, 1919
Bifascioides leucomelanella (Rebel, 1917)
Pseudascalenia riadella Kasy, 1968

Cossidae
Aethalopteryx wiltshirei Yakovlev, 2009
Azygophleps sheikh Yakovlev & Saldaitis, 2011
Meharia acuta Wiltshire, 1982
Meharia philbyi Bradley, 1952
Meharia semilactea (Warren & Rothschild, 1905)
Mormogystia proleuca (Hampson in Walsingham & Hampson, 1896)

Crambidae
Achyra nudalis (Hübner, 1796)
Ancylolomia micropalpella Amsel, 1951
Antigastra catalaunalis (Duponchel, 1833)
Cnaphalocrocis trapezalis (Guenée, 1854)
Crocidolomia pavonana (Fabricius, 1794)
Diaphana indica (Saunders, 1851)
Duponchelia fovealis Zeller, 1847
Euchromius cambridgei (Zeller, 1867)
Evergestis desertalis (Hübner, 1813)
Heliothela ophideresana (Walker, 1863)
Hellula undalis (Fabricius, 1781)
Herpetogramma licarsisalis (Walker, 1859)
Hodebertia testalis (Fabricius, 1794)
Leucinodes orbonalis Guenée, 1854
Nomophila noctuella ([Denis & Schiffermüller], 1775)
Omiodes indicata (Fabricius, 1775)
Palepicorsia ustrinalis (Christoph, 1877)
Pediasia numidellus (Rebel, 1903)
Prionapteryx soudanensis (Hampson, 1919)
Prionapteryx strioliger Rothschild, 1913
Ptychopseustis ictericalis (Swinhoe, 1885)
Pyrausta arabica Butler, 1884
Pyrausta phaenicealis (Hübner, 1818)
Spoladea recurvalis (Fabricius, 1775)
Synclera traducalis (Zeller, 1852)
Udea ferrugalis (Hübner, 1796)
Uresiphita polygonalis ([Denis & Schiffermüller], 1775)

Elachistidae
Ethmia quadrinotella (Mann, 1861)

Gelechiidae
Athrips irritans (Povolny, 1989)
Athrips sisterina (Povolny, 1989)
Ochrodia subdiminutella (Stainton, 1867)
Parapsectris amseli (Povolny, 1981)
Parapsectris buettikeri (Povolny, 1986)
Parapsectris similis (Povolny, 1981)
Scrobipalpa ergasima (Meyrick, 1916)
Scrobipalpa vicaria (Meyrick, 1921)

Geometridae
Brachyglossina sonyae Wiltshire, 1990
Charissa lequatrei (Herbulot, 1988)
Chiasmia subcurvaria (Mabille, 1897)
Cleora pavlitzkiae (D. S. Fletcher, 1958)
Hemidromodes sabulifera Prout, 1922
Idaea eremica (Brandt, 1941)
Idaea granulosa (Warren & Rothschild, 1905)
Idaea hathor (Wiltshire, 1949)
Idaea hesuata Wiltshire, 1983
Idaea illustris (Brandt, 1941)
Idaea mimetes (Brandt, 1941)
Idaea sanctaria Staudinger, 1900
Idaea sordida (Rothschild, 1913)
Idaea tahamae Wiltshire, 1983
Isturgia catalaunaria (Guenée, 1858)
Isturgia disputaria (Guenée, 1858)
Isturgia sublimbata (Butler, 1885)
Microloxia ruficornis Warren, 1897
Neromia pulvereisparsa (Hampson, 1896)
Palaeaspilates sublutearia (Wiltshire, 1977)
Phaiogramma discessa (Walker, 1861)
Platypepla arabella Wiltshire, 1983
Pseudosterrha rufistrigata (Hampson, 1896)
Psilocerea arabica Wiltshire, 1983
Scopula actuaria (Walker, 1861)
Scopula adelpharia (Püngeler, 1894)
Xanthorhoe wiltshirei (Brandt, 1941)
Zamarada latilimbata Rebel, 1948
Zamarada minimaria Swinhoe, 1895
Zamarada torrida D. S. Fletcher, 1974

Gracillariidae
Phyllocnistis citrella Stainton, 1856
Stomphastis conflua (Meyrick, 1914)

Lasiocampidae
Braura sultani (Wiltshire, 1986)
Streblote acaciae (Klug, 1829)

Lymantriidae
Albarracina baui Standfuss, ????
Casama vilis (Walker, 1865)
Euproctis cervina Moore, ????

Metarbelidae
Metarbela taifensis Wiltshire, 1988

Micronoctuidae
Micronola wadicola Amsel, 1935

Nepticulidae
Stigmella birgittae Gustafsson, 1985

Noctuidae
Acantholipes aurea Berio, 1966
Acantholipes circumdata (Walker, 1858)
Achaea catella Guenée, 1852
Achaea faber Holland, 1894
Achaea finita (Guenée, 1852)
Achaea mercatoria (Fabricius, 1775)
Achaea trapezoides (Guenée, 1862)
Acontia albarabica Wiltshire, 1994
Acontia asbenensis (Rothschild, 1921)
Acontia basifera Walker, 1857
Acontia binominata (Butler, 1892)
Acontia crassivalva (Wiltshire, 1947)
Acontia dichroa (Hampson, 1914)
Acontia hortensis Swinhoe, 1884
Acontia imitatrix Wallengren, 1856
Acontia insocia (Walker, 1857)
Acontia lactea Hacker, Legrain & Fibiger, 2008
Acontia leucotrigona (Hampson, 1905)
Acontia notabilis (Walker, 1857)
Acontia nubila Hampson, 1910
Acontia philbyi Wiltshire, 1988
Acontia semialba Hampson, 1910
Acontia trabealis (Scopoli, 1973)
Acontia transfigurata Wallengren, 1856
Acontia trimaculata Aurivillius, 1879
Acontia yemenensis (Hampson, 1918)
Adisura bella Gaede, 1915
Aegle exsiccata (Warren & Rothschild, 1905)
Aegocera rectilinea Boisduval, 1836
Agrotis biconica Kollar, 1844
Agrotis herzogi Rebel, 1911
Agrotis ipsilon (Hufnagel, 1766)
Agrotis pictifascia (Hampson, 1896)
Agrotis sardzeana Brandt, 1941
Agrotis segetum ([Denis & Schiffermüller], 1775)
Agrotis trux (Hübner, 1824)
Amyna axis Guenée, 1852
Amyna delicata Wiltshire, 1994
Amyna punctum (Fabricius, 1794)
Anarta trifolii (Hufnagel, 1766)
Anomis flava (Fabricius, 1775)
Anomis leona (Schaus & Clements, 1893)
Antarchaea conicephala (Staudinger, 1870)
Antarchaea digramma (Walker, 1863)
Antarchaea erubescens (Bang-Haas, 1910)
Antarchaea fragilis (Butler, 1875)
Anticarsia rubricans (Boisduval, 1833)
Anumeta spilota (Erschoff, 1874)
Asota speciosa (Drury, 1773)
Asplenia melanodonta (Hampson, 1896)
Athetis gizana Wiltshire, 1986
Athetis pigra (Guenée, 1852)
Attatha metaleuca Hampson, 1913
Aucha polyphaenoides (Wiltshire, 1961)
Autoba abrupta (Walker, 1865)
Beihania cuculiella Wiltshire, 1967
Brevipecten biscornuta Wiltshire, 1985
Brithysana africana Laporte, 1973
Calesia xanthognatha Hampson, 1926
Callopistria latreillei (Duponchel, 1827)
Callyna figurans Walker, 1858
Caradrina anomoeosis (Hampson, 1902)
Caradrina clavipalpis (Scopoli, 1763)
Caradrina elongata (Plante, 1997)
Caradrina pseudocosma (Plante, 1997)
Caradrina soudanensis (Hampson, 1918)
Caranilla uvarovi (Wiltshire, 1949)
Carcharoda yemenicola Wiltshire, 1983
Chrysodeixis chalcites (Esper, 1789)
Clytie devia (Swinhoe, 1884)
Clytie euryphaea Hampson, 1918
Clytie infrequens (Swinhoe, 1884)
Clytie tropicalis Rungs, 1975
Colobochyla platyzona Lederer,
Condica capensis (Guenée, 1852)
Condica conducta (Walker, 1857)
Condica illecta Walker, 1865
Condica viscosa (Freyer, 1831)
Cryphia paulina (Staudinger, 1891)
Ctenoplusia accentifera (Lefèbvre, 1827)
Ctenoplusia fracta (Walker, 1857)
Ctenoplusia furcifera (Walker, 1857)
Ctenoplusia limbirena (Guenée, 1852)
Diadochia stigmatica Wiltshire, 1985
Drasteria kabylaria (Bang-Haas, 1906)
Dysgonia angularis (Boisduval, 1833)
Dysgonia torrida (Guenée, 1852)
Dysmilichia pica Wiltshire, 1983
Ericeia congregata (Walker, 1858)
Eublemma apicipunctalis (Brandt, 1939)
Eublemma baccalix (Swinhoe, 1886)
Eublemma bifasciata (Moore, 1881)
Eublemma cochylioides (Guenée, 1852)
Eublemma deserti (Rothschild, 1909)
Eublemma ecthaemata Hampson, 1896
Eublemma gayneri (Rothschild, 1901)
Eublemma khonoides Wiltshire, 1980
Eublemma pallidula (Herrich-Schäffer, 1851)
Eublemma parva (Hübner, [1808])
Eublemma ragusana (Freyer, 1844)
Eublemma robertsi Berio, 1969
Eublemma scitula (Rambur, 1833)
Eublemma seminivea Hampson, 1896
Eublemma siticuosa (Lederer, 1858)
Eublemma stygiochroa Hampson, 1910
Eublemma thermobasis Hampson, 1910
Eublemma tomentalis Rebel, 1948
Eulocastra alfierii Wiltshire, 1948
Eutelia mima Prout, 1925
Feliniopsis consummata (Walker, 1857)
Feliniopsis hosplitoides (Laporte, 1979)
Feliniopsis talhouki (Wiltshire, 1983)
Gnamptonyx innexa (Walker, 1858)
Grammodes stolida (Fabricius, 1775)
Hadena laudeti (Boisduval, ????)
Hadjina tyriobaphes Wiltshire, 1983
Haplocestra similis Aurivillius, 1910
Helicoverpa armigera (Hübner, [1808])
Heliocheilus confertissima (Walker, 1865)
Heliothis nubigera Herrich-Schäffer, 1851
Heliothis peltigera ([Denis & Schiffermüller], 1775)
Heterographa pungeleri Bartel, 1904
Heteropalpia acrosticta (Püngeler, 1904)
Heteropalpia cortytoides Berio, 1939
Heteropalpia exarata (Mabille, 1890)
Heteropalpia profesta (Christoph, 1887)
Heteropalpia robusta Wiltshire, 1988
Heteropalpia rosacea (Rebel, 1907)
Hipoepa fractalis (Guenée, 1854)
Hypena abyssinialis Guenée, 1854
Hypena laceratalis Walker, 1859
Hypena lividalis (Hübner, 1790)
Hypena obacerralis Walker, [1859]
Hypena obsitalis (Hübner, [1813])
Hypena varialis Walker, 1866
Hypotacha boursini Warnecke, 1937
Hypotacha ochribasalis (Hampson, 1896)
Hypotacha raffaldii Berio, 1939
Iambiodes postpallida Wiltshire, 1977
Lacera alope (Cramer, 1780)
Leucania loreyi (Duponchel, 1827)
Leucania sicula Treitschke, 1835
Lithacodia blandula (Guenée, 1862)
Masalia albiseriata (Druce, 1903)
Masalia perstriata (Hampson, 1903)
Maxera nigriceps (Walker, 1858)
Mesoligia algaini Wiltshire, 1983
Metachrostis quinaria (Moore, 1881)
Metagarista subcrocea Wiltshire, 1983
Metopoceras kneuckeri (Rebel, 1903)
Mimasura dhofarica Wiltshire, 1985
Mocis frugalis (Fabricius, 1775)
Mocis mayeri (Boisduval, 1833)
Mocis proverai Zilli, 2000
Mythimna languida (Walker, 1858)
Mythimna umbrigera (Saalmüller, 1891)
Nimasia brachyura Wiltshire, 1982
Ophiusa dianaris (Guenée, 1852)
Ophiusa tirhaca (Cramer, 1777)
Oraesia intrusa (Krüger, 1939)
Ozarba algaini Wiltshire, 1983
Ozarba atrifera Hampson, 1910
Ozarba debrosi Wiltshire, 1983
Ozarba mesozonata Hampson, 1916
Ozarba nyanza (Felder & Rogenhofer, 1874)
Ozarba semitorrida Hampson, 1916
Ozarba socotrana Hampson, 1910
Ozarba timida Berio, 1940
Pandesma robusta (Walker, 1858)
Pericyma mendax (Walker, 1858)
Pericyma metaleuca Hampson, 1913
Peridroma saucia (Hübner, [1808])
Phytometra hesuensis (Wiltshire, 1983)
Plusiopalpa dichora Holland, 1894
Polydesma umbricola Boisduval, 1833
Polymixis juditha (Staudinger, 1897)
Polytela cliens (Felder & Rogenhofer, 1874)
Prionofrontia ochrosia Hampson, 1926
Pseudopseustis beduina (Wiltshire, 1948)
Pseudozarba mesozona (Hampson, 1896)
Pseudozarba orthozona Wiltshire, 1985
Rhynchina albiscripta Hampson, 1916
Rhynchina revolutalis (Zeller, 1852)
Rhynchodontodes antistropha (Vári, 1962)
Scythocentropus inquinata (Mabille, 1888)
Sesamia nonagrioides (Lefèbvre, 1827)
Simplicia extinctalis (Zeller, 1852)
Simyra confusa (Walker, 1856)
Sphingomorpha chlorea (Cramer, 1777)
Spodoptera cilium Guenée, 1852
Spodoptera exempta (Walker, 1857)
Spodoptera exigua (Hübner, 1808)
Spodoptera littoralis (Boisduval, 1833)
Spodoptera mauritia (Boisduval, 1833)
Syngrapha circumflexa (Linnaeus, 1767)
Talhoukia feifae Wiltshire, 1986
Tathorhynchus exsiccata (Lederer, 1855)
Thiacidas adnanensis (Wiltshire, 1980)
Thiacidas cerurodes (Hampson, 1916)
Thiacidas postica Walker, 1855
Thiacidas roseotincta (Pinhey, 1962)
Thysanoplusia daubei (Boisduval, 1840)
Thysanoplusia sestertia (Felder & Rogenhofer, 1874)
Trichoplusia ni (Hübner, [1803])
Trichoplusia orichalcea (Fabricius, 1775)
Trigonodes exportata Guenée, 1852
Tytroca leucoptera (Hampson, 1896)
Ulotrichopus tinctipennis (Hampson, 1902)
Vittaplusia vittata (Wallengren, 1856)

Nolidae
Archinola pyralidia Hampson, 1896
Arcyophora longivalvis Guenée, 1852
Arcyophora patricula (Hampson, 1902)
Earias biplaga Walker, 1866
Earias cupreoviridis (Walker, 1862)
Earias insulana (Boisduval, 1833)
Giaura dakkaki Wiltshire, 1986
Lophocrama phoenicochlora Hampson, 1912
Maurilia arcuata (Walker, [1858])
Neaxestis montivalva Wiltshire, 1986
Odontestis murina Wiltshire, 1988
Pardasena virgulana (Mabille, 1880)
Pardoxia graellsii (Feisthamel, 1837)
Xanthodes albago (Fabricius, 1794)

Oecophoridae
Amseloecia arabica Povolny, 1983
Stathmopoda diplaspis (Meyrick, 1887)

Psychidae
Psyche luteipalpis Walker, 1870

Pterophoridae
Agdistis arabica Amsel, 1958
Agdistis bellissima Arenberger, 1975
Agdistis frankeniae (Zeller, 1847)
Agdistis hakimah Arenberger, 1985
Agdistis nanodes Meyrick, 1906
Agdistis obstinata Meyrick, 1920
Agdistis olei Arenberger, 1976
Agdistis parvella Amsel, 1958
Agdistis tamaricis (Zeller, 1847)
Arcoptilia gizan Arenberger, 1985
Diacrotricha lanceatus (Arenberger, 1986)
Emmelina monodactyla (Linnaeus, 1758)
Megalorhipida leucodactylus (Fabricius, 1794)
Porrittia imbecilla (Meyrick, 1925)
Stenodacma wahlbergi (Zeller, 1852)
Stenoptilia amseli Arenberger, 1990
Stenoptilodes taprobanes (Felder & Rogenhofer, 1875)

Pyralidae
Anagasta kuehniella (Zeller, 1879)
Ancylosis faustinella (Zeller, 1867)
Ancylosis lacteicostella (Ragonot, 1887)
Ancylosis limoniella (Chrétien, 1911)
Ancylosis nigritarsea Hampson, 1896
Ancylosis nubeculella (Ragonot, 1887)
Ancylosis obscuripunctella Roesler, 1973
Arenipses sabella Hampson, 1901
Bazaria pempeliella Ragonot, 1893
Cadra calidella (Guenée, 1845)
Emmalocera strigicostella (Hampson, 1896)
Hypotia rufimarginalis (Hampson, 1896)
Hypotia vulgaris (Butler, 1881)
Raphimetopus ablutella (Zeller, 1839)
Staudingeria partitella Ragonot, 1887
Staudingeria yerburii (Butler, 1884)
Thylacoptila paurosema Meyrick, 1885

Sphingidae
Euchloron megaera (Linnaeus, 1758)
Hippotion celerio (Linnaeus, 1758)
Hippotion moorei Jordan, 1926
Hippotion pentagramma (Hampson, 1910)
Macroglossum trochilus (Hübner, 1823)
Pseudoclanis molitor (Rothschild & Jordan, 1912)

Tineidae
Perissomastix nigriceps Warren & Rothschild, 1905
Trichophaga abruptella (Wollaston, 1858)
Trichophaga swinhoei (Butler, 1884)

Tortricidae
Aphelia deserticolor Diakonoff, 1983
Bactra bactrana (Kennel, 1901)
Bactra minima Meyrick, 1909
Bactra simpliciana Chrétien, 1915
Bactra venosana (Zeller, 1847)
Cirriphora pharaonana (Kollar, 1858)
Cochylimorpha lagara (Diakonoff, 1983)
Crocidosema plebejana Zeller, 1847
Cryptophlebia melanopoda Diakonoff, 1983
Cryptophlebia peltastica (Meyrick, 1921)
Cydia alabastrina Diakonoff, 1983
Cydia dissulta Diakonoff, 1983
Cydia melanoptycha Diakonoff, 1983
Cydia odontica Diakonoff, 1983
Cydia periclydonia Diakonoff, 1983
Dasodis cladographa Diakonoff, 1983
Eccopsis wahlbergiana Zeller, 1852
Endothenia oblongana (Haworth, 1811)
Fulcrifera leucophaea Diakonoff, 1983
Fulcrifera refrigescens (Meyrick, 1924)
Grapholita steringus Diakonoff, 1983
Gypsonoma riparia Meyrick, 1933
Lobesia vectis Diakonoff, 1983
Namasia catoptrica Diakonoff, 1983
Pammene megalocephala Diakonoff, 1983
Procrica ammina Diakonoff, 1983
Protancylis amseli Diakonoff, 1983
Selania resedana (Obraztsov, 1959)
Strepsicrates cryptosema Diakonoff, 1983
Trachysmia jerichoana (Amsel, 1935)

Xyloryctidae
Eretmocera fasciata Walsingham, 1896
Scythris kebirella Amsel, 1935

References

External links 
 

Lists of moths by country
Lists of moths of Asia
Moths

Moths